Ouroboros: Seasons of Life—Women's Passages is a Neopagan oratorio by musician, author, and composer Kay Gardner. Written between 1992 and 1994, it was produced by Ladyslipper Records and recorded by an all-female group for the 1994 National Women's Music Festival. Ouroboros: Seasons of Life musically portrays a woman's life cycle from birth to death using Neopagan symbols and imagery. The Triple Goddess aspects of Maiden, Mother, and Crone are prominently featured, as are the four seasons and Neopagan holidays. 

CD information: Ouroboros: Seasons of Life—Women's Passages (1994)
Ladyslipper; ASIN: B000008T5H

Movements
 Beginning
 Birth/Winter Solstice
Birth of the Sun-Child
Birth Interlude
Birth Chant
Childhood/Imbolic
Round Is Magic
Childhood Interlude
Childhood Chant
Puberty/Spring Equinox
My First Moontime
Puberty Interlude
Puberty Chant
Maidenhood/Beltane
May Eve
Maidenhood Interlude
Maidenhood Chant
Motherhood/Summer Solstice
So Newly Come
I Dance Yes
Motherhood Interlude
Menopause/Lammas
Blood-Rite of the Thirteenth Moon
Menopause Interlude
Elderhood/Autumn Equinox
The Crone
Elderhood Interlude
Elderhood Chant
Death-Rebirth/Samhain
Death of the Old One
Death Chant

See also 
Neopagan music

References 

Oratorios
Modern pagan music
Women's music
1990s in modern paganism